Michael Manwaring (born March 21, 1942) is an American designer and artist, he was the Principal at The Office of Michael Manwaring design firm. He was based in San Francisco for more than 40 years and was one of the founders of the San Francisco Bay Area postmodern movement in graphic design, that later became known as the "Pacific Wave". He is currently located in Portland, Oregon.

Biography 
Manwaring was born and grew up in Palo Alto, near Stanford University where his father taught. He attended San Francisco Art Institute (SFAI) and studied design with Jim Robertson, of the Robertson Montgomery design firm as well as Gordon Ashby,  Barbara Stauffacher Solomon, and Jack Stauffacher. He was inspired in his early career by the Swiss designer Josef Muller-Brockmann and his 'Beethoven poster'. While in college he started freelance work for the Surf Theater on Irving Street and 48th Street, designing film posters. While still in school he worked with designer Gordon Ashby, together they worked on the IBM-sponsored Astronomia exhibition (1964) at the Hayden Planetarium in New York. 

Manwarning designed public signage for a number of cities in the Bay Area during the 1970s though 1990s, often inspired by large scale Supergraphics. In the 1970s, Manwaring designed an iconic public art sign in the Bayview neighborhood that reads, "India Basin Industrial Park" in Helvetica font, each letter was made of concrete. In 1996, he designed alongside historian Nancy Leigh Olmstead the Embarcadero Interpretive Signage, a 2.5 mile long walk along San Francisco's Embarcadero neighborhood with 22 signs sharing historical relevance of a location.  

In the 1980s a few San Francisco–based designers were nicknamed “The Michaels” because they all had the same name (Manwaring, alongside Mabry, Cronan, Vanderbyl, Schwab), and later they were known as the "Pacific Wave" according to historian Steven Heller. Manwaring was known to design the environmental design for projects (such as interior design, logos, signage, packaging, and marketing design), not only the graphic design.

In 2006, he moved to Portland, Oregon.

His work is in various public museum collections including San Francisco Museum of Modern Art (SFMoMA), Los Angeles County Museum of Art (LACMA), among others.

Publications

References

Further reading 
 

1942 births
San Francisco Art Institute alumni
Living people
American graphic designers
AIGA medalists
Artists from San Francisco
Artists from Portland, Oregon
People from Palo Alto, California